Sălciua is a commune located in Alba County, Transylvania, Romania. It is composed of six villages: Dealu Caselor (Hegyik), Dumești, Sălciua de Jos (the commune center; Alsószolcsva), Sălciua de Sus (Felsőszolcsva), Sub Piatră (Búvópatak) and Valea Largă (Malompataka). It has a population of 1,428.

Geography
The commune is located the ethnogeographical region of Țara Moților, in the middle of the Apuseni Mountains.

Lying on the banks of the Arieș River, in between the Trascău Mountains and Muntele Mare, Sălciua has a specific mountain landscape developed on limestone and crystalline schists. The big Arieș meadow offers favorable conditions for agriculture, the large crop fields leading to the area being named the "Bărăgan of the Apuseni Mountains".

The great variety of karst topography, with its spectacular flora and fauna and climatic characteristics make it a big tourist attraction. The village also has historic wooden churches.

History
In 1925, a few Romanian families were relocated in Banat, where they founded Sălciua Nouă village (the New Sălciua), now part of Pișchia commune, in Timiș County.

Sights
"Cuvioasa Parascheva" wooden church (1798), in Sub Piatră village.
"Sfânta Treime" and "Sfântul Ilie" wooden churches (1782), in Valea Largă village.
 Huda lui Păpară cave.
 Poarta Zmeilor (Gate of Dragons) cave, in Sub Piatră village.
"Vânătările Ponorului" natural reservation, in Dumești village.
"Scărița–Șesul Craiului" natural reservation.
"Detunata" (the Roar) geological reservation.

Natives
Valeriu Tabără

References

Communes in Alba County
Localities in Transylvania